Bank Bay is an unincorporated area in central Alberta, Canada within the Municipal District of Bonnyville No. 87. It is located on the bank of the Cold Lake Provincial Park.

See also 
List of communities in Alberta

Localities in the Municipal District of Bonnyville No. 87